Olivier Bahati (born September 2, 1985 in Bujumbura) is a Burundian footballer who plays as a defender for Mukura Victory Sports FC in the Rwandan Premier League.

Bahati started his career with Mukura Victory Sports in 2004.

International career
He represented his homeland, Burundi, on international levels as of 2003.

External links
 

1985 births
Living people
Sportspeople from Bujumbura
Burundian footballers
Burundi international footballers
Association football defenders
Burundian expatriate footballers
Burundian expatriate sportspeople in Rwanda
Expatriate footballers in Rwanda